Thomas Hamer may refer to:

Thomas L. Hamer (1800–1846), United States congressman and soldier
Thomas Ray Hamer (1864–1950), United States Representative from Idaho
Thomas Hamer (swimmer) (born 1998), British swimmer
Tom Hamer (born 1999), English footballer for Burton Albion FC